Country Club was a Canadian television variety series which aired on CBC Television in 1958.

Premise
This mid-year replacement series was hosted by Don Francks and Patti Lewis on a set which resembled a ballroom at a country club. The house band was led by Bert Niosi.

Scheduling
The series was broadcast on Fridays at 9:30 p.m.

References

External links
 

CBC Television original programming
1958 Canadian television series debuts
1958 Canadian television series endings
1950s Canadian variety television series
Black-and-white Canadian television shows
English-language television shows